Octalene is a polycyclic hydrocarbon composed of two fused cyclooctatetraene rings.

Anions

Octalene can be readily reduced by lithium to a dianion  and, unusually for such a small molecule, a tetraanion . The di-anion has its two negative charges in one ring, converting that ring into a 10-pi electron aromatic system similar to the di-anion of cyclooctatetraene. In the 18-pi electron tetra-anion, both rings effectively have access to 10 pi electrons, leading to a planar, bicyclic aromatic structure analogous to that of naphthalene.

See also 
Propalene
Benzyne
Pentalene
Heptalene
Butalene

References

Polycyclic nonaromatic hydrocarbons
Bicyclic compounds